Utah Western Railway may refer to:
Utah Western Railway (1874–1880), west from Salt Lake City to Stockton, later part of the Union Pacific Railroad
Utah Western Railway (1889–1890), west from Salt Lake City to the Great Salt Lake, graded but never completed